{{Infobox university
| name = American University of Armenia
| image = AUA official logo.png
| image_size = 200px
| caption = AUA visual identifier
| established = 
| type = Private
| accreditation = WASC
| motto = Aspire, Inspire, Achieve 
| president = Armen Der Kiureghian
| director = 
| head_label = 
| head = 
| academic_staff = 267 (fall 2021)
| administrative_staff = 219 (fall 2021)
| students = 2,231 (fall 2022)
| undergrad = 1,811 (fall 2022)
| postgrad = 420 (fall 2022)
| other = 
| city = Yerevan
| country = Armenia
| campus = Urban
| colours =   
| website = 
| logo = 
| footnotes = 
| coor = | affiliations = University of California
}}

The American University of Armenia (AUA) (ՀԱՀ; Hayastani amerikyan hamalsaran, HAH) is a private, independent university in Yerevan, Armenia that is accredited by the Western Association of Schools and Colleges Senior College and University Commission. It is the first U.S.-accredited institution in the former Soviet Union that provides undergraduate and graduate education.

It was founded in 1991, Armenia's first year of independence, by the Armenian General Benevolent Union (AGBU), the University of California (UC), and the Armenian government. The university is the country's first institution modeled on Western-style higher education, committed to teaching, research, and service; it offers 11 master's and 7 bachelor's degrees.

History
Origins
The idea of opening an American-style institution of higher education in Armenia originated in the late 1980s. When Armenia was struck by a devastating earthquake in 1988 the country, then still part of the Soviet Union, was opened to unprecedented international humanitarian and technical assistance. A number of earthquake engineers from the West helped in the reconstruction of the disaster zone. In 1989, Yuri Sarkissian, then rector of the Yerevan Polytechnic Institute, suggested to Armen Der Kiureghian, Professor of Civil Engineering at the University of California, Berkeley, that an Armenian technical university based on the Western model ought to be established to foster educational progress in Armenia. The proposition was narrowed to the creation a graduate university on the American model. Der Kiureghian and another earthquake engineer, Mihran Agbabian, Professor Emeritus at the University of Southern California, set out to realize the goal. A number of American and Armenian academics supported the concept of the university. Der Kiureghian and Agbabian, along with the late Stepan Karamardian, formerly Dean of the A. Gary Anderson Graduate School of Management at the University of California, Riverside, presented their proposal to the Armenian government. Agbabian became the founding president in 1991 and served until 1997.

The Armenian General Benevolent Union (AGBU) and the University of California (UC) helped realize AUA. The Armenian government—in particular the Ministry of Higher Education and Sciences (now the Ministry of Education and Science)—offered financial and logistical support for the university despite the turbulent political and economic circumstances in Armenia between 1989 and 1991. The AGBU underwrote a significant portion of the operational funding; when the UC was asked for its assistance in founding the university, its president David P. Gardner appointed a task force led by Senior Vice President for Academic Affairs William R. Frazer to evaluate the possibility of an affiliation between AUA and UC. After the task force's visit to Armenia in July 1990, the Regents of the University of California voted unanimously in favor of an affiliation, through which UC provides technical support and experience for the growth of AUA and collaborates with AUA in preparing its faculty.

First years
The university was formally established on September 21, 1991, the day Armenia held an independence referendum, and opened two days later. AUA began instruction with 101 students, who were enrolled in an intensive English-language program and later allocated into three graduate degree programs. In 1993, AUA's first commencement took place when 38 people graduated with master's degrees in Business and Management, Industrial Engineering, and Earthquake Engineering. The AUA Extension, a program offering short courses and training programs, was established in 1992.

Expansion
The university introduced an undergraduate program in 2013. That year some 300 students were accepted.

Campus and estate

The university's two central buildings, the Main Building and the Paramaz Avedisian Building, are located at 40 Marshal Baghramyan Avenue in central Yerevan.

Main building
The university's main building, informally known as the "old building" (հին մասնաշենք), housed the Political Enlightenment House of the Central Committee of the Armenian Communist Party during the Soviet period. It was granted to the AUA on September 21, 1991, by the government. It has six floors and originally had lecture halls, auditoriums, laboratories, library facilities, and offices. After the construction of the Paramaz Avedisian Building in 2008, it has been used for administrative and non-academic purposes. The main building has solar panels on its rooftop, which have a capacity of around 50 kilowatt hour (kWh) and photoelectric capacity of 5 kWh, which secures the continuous operation of the whole system.

Paramaz Avedisian Building
Construction of the Paramaz Avedisian Building (PAB) began in 2005. It was designed by Gagik Galstyan and was dedicated on November 1, 2008. Located next to the main building, it has  of space, which accommodates classrooms and seminar rooms, laboratories and research centers, and faculty offices. The AUA Student Union adjacent to the Paramaz Avedisian Building (PAB) was constructed in 2018.

AUA Center
The AUA Center is located at 9 Alex Manoogian Street in central Yerevan. It is a multiple-use rental facility suitable for business or not-for-profit organizations. It has two conference and meeting rooms and a large auditorium. The center was established in 1999 through financial support of the U.S. government.

AUA Vartkes and Hasmig Barsam Building
In 2005 the AUA acquired the Hye Business Suites Hotel located at 8 Mher Mkrtchyan Street in central Yerevan. It was donated to the university by Vartkes Barsam and is used to house visiting faculty and students, and provides additional income for the university. United States Agency for International Development (USAID) invested US$300,000 to renovate and upgrade the building.

Dzoragyugh Buildings
Two buildings were donated to AUA by philanthropists K. George and Dr. Carolann Najarian in 2016. Upon successful completion of the first building, AUA Student Residence, the construction of the Najarian Center for Social Entrepreneurship started in mid-April 2021 and is set to open its doors in Summer of 2023.

AGBU Papazian Library
The AGBU Papazian Library came into existence in 1991 when AUA was established. It is named after the Papazian family, who were generous benefactors of the AUA.  the library contained 31,426 printed books and 482,350 digital books, journals, and CDs, DVDs, and audio and video cassettes. Several notable Armenian Americans, including historian Richard G. Hovannisian who donated 1,338 books to the library and academic and educator Vartan Gregorian who donated over 600 mostly English-language titles in 2014, have donated books to the library.

Accreditation
The AUA was accredited by the Western Association of Schools and Colleges (WASC) Senior College and University Commission in 2006. The university had received the candidacy status for accreditation in 2002, becoming the first university in the former Soviet Union to be accredited by a U.S. educational institution. Accreditation means degrees issued by the AUA have a status equal to those issued in the U.S. By 2013, the university had received accreditation from WASC and a license from the Armenian Ministry of Education and Science to offer four-year education.

Notable alumni
David Akopyan, the United Nations Development Programme (UNDP) Resident Representative a.i. in Syria, graduated from Master of Business Administration (MBA) program in 1993
Emil Babayan, Deputy Prosecutor General (since 2013) who holds a degree of Master of Laws from 2001
Sedrak Barseghyan, Adviser to Minister-Chief of Government Staff of Armenia (since 2013). Class of 2009.
Lilit Galstian, a member of parliament from the Armenian Revolutionary Federation (2007–2012) who graduated from the faculty of Political Sciences and International Relations in 1996
Tevan Poghosyan, a member of parliament from Heritage party (since 2012) who graduated from the faculty of Political Sciences and International Relations in 1996
Hovhannes Avoyan, chief executive officer and Founder of Picsart, who graduated as a Master of Political Sciences and International Relations in 1995.
Artashes Emin, translator, former Honorary Consul of Canada. Graduated as a Master of Law in 1999.
Anahit Avanesian, Armenian Minister of Health
Anna Simonyan, Federal MP Candidate for Bloc Quebecois & Commission Members and founder of Clove a start up with offices in Yerevan, Montreal and San Francisco. Graduated with an MBA in 2001.
Dalita Avanesian, Armenian singer and actor.

 Colleges and schools 
 Zaven & Sonia Akian College of Science & Engineering
 Manoogian Simone College of Business & Economics
 College of Humanities & Social Sciences
 Gerald & Patricia Turpanjian School of Public Health

 Undergraduate programs  
 Bachelor of Arts in Business
 Bachelor of Arts in English and Communications
 Bachelor of Arts in Politics and Governance
 Bachelor of Science in Computer Science
 Bachelor of Science in Engineering Sciences
 Bachelor of Science in Data Science
 Bachelor of Science in Nursing
 Bachelor of Science in Environmental and Sustainability Science

 Graduate programs 
 Master of Business Administration
 Master of Science in Economics
 Master of Science in Management
 Master of Engineering in Industrial Engineering and Systems Management
 Master of Science in Computer and Information Science
 Master of Political Science and International Affairs
 Master of Arts in Teaching English as a Foreign Language
 Master of Laws
 Master of Public Health
 Master of Arts in Human Rights and Social Justice

 Certificate Programs 
 Graduate Certificate in Teaching English as a Foreign Language
 Graduate Certificate in Translation 
 Graduate Certificate in Finance 
 Graduate Certificate in Data Analytics
 Certificate in Hotel and Hospitality Management
 Executive Certificate in Management

Presidents
Mihran Agbabian (1991–1997)
Haroutune Armenian (1997–2009)
Bruce Boghosian (2009–2014)
Armen Der Kiureghian (2015–2019)
Karin Markides (2019-2022)
Armen Der Kiureghian (interim, 2022-)

Rankings and reputation
The American University of Armenia is widely considered one of the top universities in Armenia. It has been described as such by former Education Minister Armen Ashotyan (2009–2016),  the U.S. Embassy in Armenia, Armenian Weekly'', the Armenian service of Radio Free Europe/Radio Liberty, independent news agency CivilNet, and other media outlets. AUA has been ranked second in the country behind Yerevan State University in at least two rankings:

According to a 2009 business report by the Michigan State University, "according to those interviewed, the only reputable MBA program in Armenia is offered in Yerevan at the American University of Armenia". According to a 2004 report titled "Corruption Levies Heavy Toll on Armenian Universities" by the Embassy of the United States to Armenia, the AUA is seen by its alumni as the only "clean", non-corrupt university where "students' assessment is performance based" in Armenia. , the AUA was one of four universities in Armenia teaching public administration.

At his 2015 AUA Commencement Speech, U.S. Ambassador Richard Mills stated; "AUA is like no other university in Armenia. At no other school are you challenged to think critically like you are here. As an extension of our well-regarded University of California system, AUA has planted and nurtured informed, critical thinking skills that will stand you in good stead throughout the rest of your lives."

At a June 1994 fundraising banquet for the AUA, U.S. Ambassador to Armenia Harry Gilmore stated that the university was one of the "islands of light" in an Armenia caught in war and economic hardship, where people had been living without heat and light for several years. Gilmore praised the university as follows:

Notable visitors and speakers
Notable individuals who have visited the university and/or have given lectures include:

Chairman of the House Foreign Affairs Committee Ed Royce (April 2014);
Rock singer Serj Tankian (April 2015); 
Third President of Armenia Serzh Sargsyan (July 2015), 
Former Governor of Massachusetts and the 1988 Democratic nominee for President Michael Dukakis (April 2016); 
Democratic Representative from California Jim Costa (July 2016); 
Russian nuclear physicist Yuri Oganessian (September 2016).
American-Armenian Nobel Laureate Ardem Patapoutian (June 2022) 
Nobel Laureate Emmanuelle Charpentier (September 2022) 
NASA Engineer Nagin Cox (September 2022)

Politics
Several months after the violent crackdown of opposition protests on March 1, 2008, AUA, among other prominent institutions, refused to rent meeting space to opposition groups and democracy advocates under government pressure, according to Joseph Pennington, Deputy Chief of Mission at the U.S. Embassy in Yerevan.

On May 2, 2018, during the Velvet Revolution, a long list of AUA faculty members signed an open letter "unequivocally support[ing] the Armenian people's peaceful movement to restore social democratic values and fair, transparent elections." The letter added: "We support the students, workers, and other citizens of Armenia who are collectively saying no to oligarchic rule, corruption, a biased judiciary, and other socio-economic injustices."

Gallery

See also
Education in Armenia

Other foreign universities in Armenia
Fondation Université Française en Arménie
Russian-Armenian (Slavonic) University
 Yerevan Education and Research Institute of West Ukrainian National University

Other American universities 
American University of Beirut, Lebanon
American University of Central Asia in Bishkek, Kyrgyzstan
American University in Cairo
BYU Jerusalem Center
American University of Paris
American University in Dubai
American University in Bulgaria
 Ukrainian-American Concordia University in Kyiv, Ukraine
 American University of Moldova in Chișinău
 Romanian-American University in Bucharest
 Georgian American University in Tbilisi

References

External links

 American University of Armenia (AUA) official site
 American University of Armenia on avproduction.am

Armenian General Benevolent Union
Educational institutions established in 1991
Education in Yerevan
Schools accredited by the Western Association of Schools and Colleges
Universities in Armenia
1991 establishments in Armenia
Armenia–United States relations
English as a global language